The Phanmun Pavilion is a North Korean building located in the northern part of Panmunjom (Joint Security Area), which is a building corresponding to the South Korean building Freedom House. It was built in September 1969 as a two-story building 80 meters north of Freedom House.

For the April 2018 inter-Korean summit, Kim Jong-un left the Phanmun Pavilion at 9 a.m. (UTC+08:30), and reached the Military Demarcation Line at Panmunjom.

See also
Unification Pavilion
Inter-Korean House of Freedom
Inter-Korean Peace House
April 2018 inter-Korean summit

References 

Buildings and structures in North Korea
1969 establishments in North Korea
Panmunjom
Buildings and structures completed in 1969
20th-century architecture in North Korea